FC Beșiktaș Chișinău was a Moldovan football club based in Chișinău, Moldova. The club was founded on 2007, and then dissolved in 2008, due to financial issues. They have played in the Moldovan "A" Division, the second division in Moldovan football.

References

External links
Beșiktaș Chișinău at soccerway.com
Matches of Beșiktaș Chișinău at soccerway.com
Beșiktaș Chișinău  at sport1.md
Beșiktaș Chișinău  at stadia-md.com
The Story of Beșiktaș Chișinău 

Football clubs in Moldova
Football clubs in Chișinău
Association football clubs established in 2007
Association football clubs disestablished in 2008
Defunct football clubs in Moldova
2007 establishments in Moldova
2008 disestablishments in Moldova